ZBR may refer to:
 Bermuda Radio (callsign: ZBR), a radio station in Bermuda
 Konarak Airport, Chabahar, Iran
 Żabbar, Malta
 Zone bit recording